Nancy Norman (born Florence Berman on April 23, 1925) is an American singer.

Norman was born in Los Angeles, California

Norman studied voice while attending Roosevelt High School. She sang with a swing orchestra led by Edmundo Martinez Tostado. During this time, Norman learned that "Swing and Sway" big band leader Sammy Kaye was holding a contest in Los Angeles. She entered the Who Wants to Sing With the Band contest and Kaye was so impressed with Norman that he immediately signed her on as one of his "girl singers" in his band. At just 4’11”, barely 100 pounds, and only 16 years old, "Little Nancy Norman" as she was frequently introduced, was underaged and had to be accompanied by her mother when she traveled back to New York City, as well as traveling to other cities with the orchestra.

Norman was Kaye’s lead female singer from 1942 to 1945. Hits featuring her vocals in the 1940s include "Chickery Chick", "Saturday Night (Is the Loneliest Night of the Week)", and "There Will Never Be Another You". Norman had three songs in the Top 10 according to Billboard’s top jukebox played songs. "Chickery Chick" spent four-and-a-half months on the charts and one month at the top of the charts in 1945. Norman also introduced several classic songs such as "You'll Never Know" and "As Time Goes By". She performed with the Sammy Kaye Orchestra across the country, including New York City, Los Angeles, Chicago, and Philadelphia.

In 1948, Norman was married to singer Dick Brown. She married Robert Jacobs in 1949 and relocated to Beverly Hills, California. She still resides in her native Los Angeles in the same home she and her husband built shortly after their marriage. She has three children.

References

1925 births
Living people
American women singers
Singers from Los Angeles
20th-century American women singers
20th-century women musicians
20th-century American singers
21st-century American women